İşcan is a Turkish given name for males and a surname. Notable people with the surname include:

 Dilan Deniz Gökçek İşcan (born 1976), Turkish female football official
 Eray İşcan (born 1991), Turkish footballer
 Haşim İşcan (1898-1968), Turkish educator, province governor and the first elected mayor of Istanbul

Turkish-language surnames